Tarq (also Romanized as Ţarq; also known as Tarkh and Ţarqrūd) is a city in Tarq Rud Rural District, in the Central District of Natanz County, Isfahan Province, Iran. At the 2006 census, its population was 1,308, in 441 families.

References 

Cities in Isfahan Province
Populated places in Natanz County